The 2023 Formula 4 United States Championship season is the eighth season of the Formula 4 United States Championship, a motor racing series regulated according to FIA Formula 4 regulations and sanctioned by SCCA Pro Racing, the professional racing division of the Sports Car Club of America.

Teams and drivers

Race calendar 

The 2023 calendar was announced on 9 October 2022.

Championship standings
Points are awarded as follows:

Drivers' standings

Notes

References

External links 

 

United States F4 Championship seasons
United States F4
Formula 4 United States Championship
United States F4
United States F4